Wheelchair tennis at the 1996 Summer Paralympics consisted of four events, singles and doubles competitions for men and women.

Medal summary 

Source: Paralympic.org

Participating nations

See also
Tennis at the 1996 Summer Olympics

References 

 

 
1996 Summer Paralympics events
1996
Paralympics